Copelatus subsimilis is a species of diving beetle. It is part of the subfamily Copelatinae in the family Dytiscidae. It was described by Félix Guignot in 1958.

References

subsimilis
Beetles described in 1958